The 37.5% Arable Rent Reduction Act is an act enacted by the Republic of China (Taiwan) on 25 May 1951. The act was proposed by Jiang Menglin of the JCRR on Apr 14 1949 to Chen Cheng, the Provincial Governor of Taiwan. The act was eventually passed by the Legislative Yuan in 25 May 1951.

The act is among a series of land reform policies enacted by Republic of China aimed at reducing poverty among tenant farmers. Prior to the Taiwanese land reformation, huge wealth disparities exist in rural Taiwan, with rich land-owners collecting hefty rents from tenant farmers; these rents on average amounts to around 50% of crop yield. The 37.5% Arable Rent Reduction Act capped the maximum arable land rent to 37.5% of crop yield. Aside from that, the act provided further protection to farmers such as pardoning all rent during natural disasters, promoting farmer's associations, and limiting landlord's ability to evict tenants as they please.

The 37.5% Arable Rent Reduction Act and associating land reformation policy stems from Republic of China's official ideology of Three Principles of the People, which includes Georgist doctrine of Equalization of Land Rights. The policy yielded strong results in the improvement of life quality in rural Taiwan and facilitated Taiwan's transition from sharecropping based agriculture to landowner-farmer based agriculture.

References 

Law of Taiwan
1951 establishments in Taiwan